The Church and Convent of Santo Domingo is a convent in the city of Arequipa, Peru. It is part of the UNESCO World Heritage Site "Historic Center of the City of Arequipa".

See also
List of colonial buildings in Arequipa

References

Roman Catholic churches in Arequipa
Roman Catholic churches completed in 1677
16th-century establishments in the Spanish Empire
Dominican convents
17th-century Roman Catholic church buildings in Peru